The 1970 Inter-Cities Fairs Cup Final was the twelfth season final of the Inter-Cities Fairs Cup, staged on 22 and 28 April 1970 between Anderlecht of Belgium and Arsenal of England. In the first leg of the final tournament, Anderlecht led, 3-1, before the second leg was staged and Arsenal mounted a comeback with a 3–0 victory to a tie that Arsenal broke, 4-3, and won the season's title.

Route to the final

Match details

First leg

Second leg

Arsenal won 4–3 on aggregate.

See also
Arsenal F.C. in European football
R.S.C. Anderlecht in European football

References

2
1970
International club association football competitions hosted by Belgium
International club association football competitions hosted by London
Inter-Cities Fairs Cup Final 1970
Inter-Cities Fairs Cup Final 1970
Inter
Inter
April 1970 sports events in Europe